The City of London swords are five two-handed ceremonial swords owned by the City of London, namely the Mourning (or Black) Sword, the Pearl Sword, the State (or Sunday) Sword, the Old Bailey Sword and the Mansion House Justice Room Sword. A sixth sword, the Travelling Sword of State, replaces the Sword of State for visits outside the City. They are part of the plate collection of Mansion House, the official residence of the Lord Mayor of London.

Mourning Sword 
The Mourning Sword is used on occasions of ceremonial mourning and has also been known as the Black Sword and the Lenten Sword. Its history is somewhat uncertain—The Telegraph reports that it is believed to be 16th century and that there is a rumour that it was found in the River Thames, but there has been more than one Mourning Sword through time. 

Samuel Pepys describes in his diary entry for 2 September 1663 a conversation with the then-Lord Mayor Anthony Bateman as follows:

In his footnote to that entry in his 1893 transcription, Henry Benjamin Wheatley quotes William St John Hope, assistant secretary of the Society of Antiquaries, who had read a paper on the history of the insignia of the City of London to the society on 28 May 1891, as saying "It has long been the custom in the City as in other places to have a sword painted black and devoid of ornament, which is carried before the Lord Mayor on occasions of mourning or special solemnity. ... The present mourning sword has an old blade, but the hilt and guard, which are of iron japanned black, are of the most ordinary character and seemingly modern. The grip and sheath are covered with black velvet."

In Ceremonial Swords of Britain: State and Civic Swords (2017), Edward Barrett dates the current Mourning Sword to 1615 or 1623. While the velvet on the scabbard looks black, it is actually very deep maroon.

The Mourning Sword was carried by then-Lord Mayor Roger Gifford at the funeral of Margaret Thatcher in 2013, leading the Queen and Prince Philip in and out of St Paul's Cathedral for the ceremony. It had not previously been used at a funeral since the state funeral of Sir Winston Churchill in 1965. In addition to its use at funerals, it is used on Good Friday, feast days and the anniversary of the Great Fire of London.

Pearl Sword 

According to tradition, the Pearl Sword was presented to the City of London Corporation by Elizabeth I of England in 1571 on the occasion of the opening of the Royal Exchange. There are approximately 2,500 pearls on the sword's scabbard, from which it gets its name. In his footnote to the Diary of Samuel Pepys, Wheatley quotes Hope as saying that it is a "fine sword said to have been given to the city by Queen Elizabeth on the occasion of the opening of the Royal Exchange in 1570." but continues: "There is, however, no mention of such a gift in the City records, neither do Stow nor other old writers notice it. The sword is certainly of sixteenth century date, and is very possibly that bought in 1554, if it be not that "verye goodly sworde" given by Sir Ralph Warren in 1545."

It weighs  without the scabbard. The first  of the blade have been blued and etched with images of fruit, trophies of arms, a quiver of arrows, the city arms and a ship at sail. Its scabbard dates back to at least 1808.

When the Queen comes to the City in State, she is ceremonially welcomed at the boundary with Westminster, where Temple Bar used to be, by the Lord Mayor of London, who offers her the hilt of the Pearl Sword to touch. Before 1641, the monarch would take the sword for the duration of their visit, but in 1641 Charles I was offered it and immediately returned it to the Lord Mayor, a practice that was then carried on. The ceremony as a whole dates back to 1215 and the Royal Charter allowing direct election of the mayor (now the Lord Mayor). A similar ceremonial surrendering of the local Sword of State (a sword granted by royal gift or authorised by royal charter) is performed on royal visits to certain other cities, including York.

At the coronation of George III on 22 September 1761, the royal Sword of State was forgotten and instead Francis Hastings, 10th Earl of Huntingdon, carried the Lord Mayor's Pearl Sword for the ceremony.

In 1977 Queen Elizabeth II mused that should Idi Amin attend her Silver Jubilee uninvited, she might hit him over the head with the Pearl Sword, according to Lord Mountbatten's diary. In 2012 the ceremonial surrender of the Pearl Sword was carried out during her Diamond Jubilee. In 2016 the Pearl Sword was carried by Lord Mayor Jeffrey Mountevans to lead the Queen into St Paul's Cathedral for a service in honour of her official 90th birthday.

State Sword 
The State Sword forms one half of the Sword and Mace, symbols of the authority of the Lord Mayor and the City of London Corporation. At ceremonial events it is carried by the Sword Bearer, while the mace is carried by the Serjeant-at-Arms. The City of London has had a Sword of State since before 1373 and the first known sword-bearer of the City was John Blytone, who resigned in 1395. The current sword, which is from the mid 17th century, has a red velvet sheath and a pommel decorated with images representing Justice and Fame. It is also called the Sunday Sword, and is one of a group of eight swords made around the same time, between 1669 and 1684, and to similar specifications. Of these it particularly resembles the State Swords of Shrewsbury and Appleby-in-Westmorland. It was made around 1670 and acquired by London around 1680.

Most of the blue and gold damascene pattern that the blade used to have has since worn off.

Lord Mayor Micajah Perry was attended by the "Sunday Sword and Mace" when he laid the foundation stone of Mansion House on 25 October 1739, where the City of London swords now form part of the plate collection. The Sword and Mace are also two of the symbols used when the new Lord Mayor is invested at the Lord Mayor's Show.

In 2003 James North was appointed official sword-bearer. The costume of the bearer includes a long black robe, white gloves, large fur hat and the ceremonial sword.

Travelling State Sword 
Because the State Sword is so valuable, there is in addition a Travelling State Sword used on ceremonial occasions outside the City of London. It was made by Wilkinson Sword in 1962 and presented to the City by Lord Mayor Sir Ralph Perring. Rather than the Damascene pattern, its blade is finely etched. 

Perring himself took the Travelling State Sword on its first foreign excursion, together with the mace, on a visit to Canada in 1963, during which he opened Ottawa's Exhibition.

Old Bailey Sword 

The Old Bailey Sword hangs behind the senior judge sitting at the Old Bailey, one of the buildings housing the Crown Court in London. When the Lord Mayor opens the term at the Old Bailey, it is placed above his-or-her chair. The Cutlers' Society records that this is the sword that was made by Richard Mathew in 1562–63 and presented to the City in 1563. They quote William St John Hope describing it as follows:

It weighs  without the scabbard. Five inches (13 cm) of the  point have been damaged and repaired with electroplating. Like the Pearl Sword, the lower part of the blade is blued and decorated. Its scabbard is covered with crimson velvet and decorated with gold lace, copper-gilt and silver-gilt.

Mansion House Justice Room Sword 
The Justice Room of Mansion House was converted from the former Swordbearer's room in 1849 to operate as a court, since the Lord Mayor is chief magistrate of the City. Though the court has since moved, the Mansion House Justice Room Sword retains the name.

It has an  hilt and weighs  without the scabbard. It is from around 1830 and believed to be Portuguese.

Related collections 
Where the City of London has six ceremonial swords (including the Travelling Sword of State), Bristol, Lincoln and Exeter each have four, though two of Exeter's are not borne before the mayor. A further 13 places in Britain have two swords each, as does Dublin.

The swords of the Lord Mayor of Bristol are:
 A Mourning Sword from before 1373 when Bristol became a county corporate, originally used as a Sword of State
 A Pearl Sword from the 14th century given by Lord Mayor of London John de Welles in 1431. Ewart Oakeshott described the Type XVII sword as being large and "of superlative quality" with a "beautiful silver gilt hilt".
 A Lent Sword from the 15th century, formerly carried at the Lent assizes
 A State Sword from 1752 described by Barrett (2017) as "an inelegant but grandiose giant of a sword with a blade almost twice as wide as any other mentioned."

Lincoln's four are a Sword of State from before 1367, a Mourning, or Lent, Sword circa 1486, the Charles I sword, circa 1642, which is missing its hilt, and the George II Sword, put together in 1902 from a hilt made in 1734 and an older blade. Exeter's bearing-swords are a Sword of State, circa 1497, and a Mourning Sword, circa 1577.

See also 
 Sword of state
 Sword of justice

Notes

References

Works cited 
 
 
 
 
 
 
 
 
 

City of London
Ceremonial weapons
European swords
Individual weapons